Lincoln County is a county located in the U.S. state of Colorado. As of the 2020 census, the population was 5,675. The county seat is Hugo. The county obtains its name in memory of the United States President Abraham Lincoln. County was formed from portions of Bent and Elbert counties in 1889 from a restructuring of Colorado counties.

Geography

The main watersheds include the Arikaree and Republican Rivers in the northern part of the county and the Big Sandy, Rush, and Horse Creeks in the southern part of the county. Big Sandy and Rush Creeks ultimately drain into the Arkansas River.

Adjacent counties

 Washington County - north
 Kit Carson County - east
 Cheyenne County - east
 Crowley County - south
 Kiowa County - south
 Elbert County - west
 El Paso County - west
 Arapahoe County - northwest
 Pueblo County - southwest

Major highways
  Interstate 70

  U.S. Highway 24
  U.S. Highway 40
  U.S. Highway 287
  State Highway 71
  State Highway 94

Government
Lincoln County's government is based in the county courthouse in Hugo which is the office of the board of three elected commissioners and a county administrator, as well as the county sheriff, county clerk and recorder, county assessor, county treasurer, county coroner, and the county court (the trial court of limited jurisdiction for county affairs). Lincoln County is part of the 18th Colorado Judicial District — the state trial court of general jurisdiction — with judicial matters conducted in the Littleton and Centennial courthouses in Arapahoe County. Lincoln County's government operation also includes a department of social services, land use office, road and bridge department, human services department, public health department, mobile library services, probation department, county landfill, county fairgrounds, and county extension service.

Demographics

At the 2000 census there were 6,087 people in 2,058 households, including 1,389 families, in the county.  The population density was 2 people per square mile (1/km2).  There were 2,406 housing units at an average density of 1 per square mile (0/km2).  The racial makeup of the county was 86.30% White, 4.96% Black or African American, 0.94% Native American, 0.56% Asian, 0.03% Pacific Islander, 5.65% from other races, and 1.56% from two or more races.  8.53% of the population were Hispanic or Latino of any race.
Of the 2,058 households 33.70% had children under the age of 18 living with them, 55.30% were married couples living together, 8.40% had a female householder with no husband present, and 32.50% were non-families. 29.00% of households were one person and 13.00% were one person aged 65 or older.  The average household size was 2.44 and the average family size was 3.04.

The age distribution was 23.90% under the age of 18, 7.10% from 18 to 24, 33.00% from 25 to 44, 21.80% from 45 to 64, and 14.30% 65 or older.  The median age was 38 years. For every 100 females there were 130.90 males.  For every 100 females age 18 and over, there were 140.70 males.

The median household income was $31,914 and the median family income was $39,738. Males had a median income of $25,742 versus $22,188 for females. The per capita income for the county was $15,510.  About 8.10% of families and 11.70% of the population were below the poverty line, including 14.40% of those under age 18 and 11.50% of those age 65 or over.

Communities

Towns
Arriba
Genoa
Hugo
Limon

Unincorporated communities
Bovina
Boyero
Karval
Punkin Center

Historic trail
Smoky Hill Trail

The name "Smoky Hill" comes from the appearance of the misty or smoky hills that the westward travelers viewed on their journey from Kansas and Nebraska Territories and Missouri toward the Colorado Gold Rush starting in 1858. Gold, had been discovered in the Cherry Creek, near Denver. The image of the misty hills and valleys along the route west gave the name to the trail for these travelers — the Smoky Hill Trail.  Parts of the trail can still be seen as a two-track road on the Eastern Plains in what was once Kansas Territory but now is Colorado.
 
The section of the Smoky Hill Trail which passes through much of the High Plains has become known as the "starvation trail."  This section of the trail proved to be the most difficult, due to a lack of water, yet the Plains Indians of the day considered this region as prime hunting ground.

See also

Outline of Colorado
Index of Colorado-related articles
National Register of Historic Places listings in Lincoln County, Colorado

References

External links
Official website
Colorado County Evolution by Don Stanwyck
Colorado Historical Society

 

 
Colorado counties
1889 establishments in Colorado
Eastern Plains
Populated places established in 1889